This is a list of fictional characters featured in the Pokémon Adventures manga.

Pokédex holders

Kanto Pokédex holders

Red
 is a Trainer who starts off in Pallet Town as an aspiring trainer with a Poliwhirl which later evolved into Poliwrath, believing himself to be superior to his peers. He starts his Pokémon journey with a Bulbasaur he received from Professor Oak, which evolved into Ivysaur and later Venusaur. He is rivals with Professor Oak's grandson, Blue. He caught a Pikachu that became his main Pokémon.

In the first arc, Red suffers his first overwhelming defeat when he fails to capture the mysterious Mew, leading him to Professor Oak for advice on becoming a better Pokémon trainer. Professor Oak gives him a Pokédex, and sends him on a long journey across Kanto to record all of the pokémon, crossing paths with Blue and Green along the way. During his journey, he is entangled in many plots by the nefarious Team Rocket, effectively foiling them each time. Together with Blue and Green, Red ultimately defeats Team Rocket when they tried to take control of Articuno, Zapdos and Moltres. Red also defeats the Team Rocket leader Giovanni in a one-on-one Pokémon battle and captures Team Rocket's ultimate weapon, the genetically created Pokémon Mewtwo. Finally, Red participates in the Indigo Plateau Pokémon League Tournament, overcoming his rival Blue in the final match and becoming the Pokémon Champion.

Red plays a smaller role in the Yellow saga, during which he is captured by the Elite Four, a quartet of evil Pokémon trainers, after refusing to participate in their plans. He is later rescued by Giovanni, and defeats the Elite Four alongside his allies. In the Gold, Silver & Crystal saga, he attempts to become Gym Leader of Viridian City, but injuries sustained from when he was captured by the Elite Four prevent him from doing so. After recovering from his injuries, he aids his allies in fighting the Mask of Ice (Pryce), the leader of Neo Team Rocket.

Red returns to a leading role in the FireRed and LeafGreen saga, where he teams up with Blue and Green to rescue Professor Oak, who has been kidnapped and taken to the Sevii Islands. While there, he encounters a newly revived Team Rocket and the Pokémon Deoxys. After his team loses to them, Mewtwo appears to help them. The team then manage to defeat Giovanni and Deoxys and other companions but Red, along with Green, Blue, Yellow, and Silver, is turned into stone. He and his companions were eventually freed from their petrified forms in the Emerald saga.

Red appears again alongside Green in Hoenn when they went there during the Omega Ruby and Alpha Sapphire saga and confronted Maxie and Archie. Though his Venusaur is capable of Mega Evolution, they are defeated after Groudon becomes Primal Groudon, but were saved thanks to Giovanni who took them on his airship.

Red's Pokémon include Saur (Venasaur), Poli (Poliwrath), Snor (Snorlax), Aero (Aerodactyl), Gyara (Gyarados), and Pika (Pikachu). While Red was frozen by the Elite Four, his Pika had to team up with Yellow, and while Red left for the hot springs, he again asked Yellow to take care of Pika. 
In Japan, Red was voted by readers from the series as its most popular character in 2005 & 2011.

Blue
Starting out quite cocky and arrogant, Blue becomes more down-to-earth and aloof as the series progresses. He specializes in training Pokémon, even those that are not his. He is the rival of Red, though the ferocity of their rivalry has toned down as the series progresses. He is also Professor Oak's grandson, and he has a sister named Daisy.

In the first arc, Blue attempts to capture the mythical Pokémon Mew but backs down as soon as he realizes his opponent is far superior. Witnessing Red's attempt to catch it without hesitation sparks his resentment. He later encounters Red again in Viridian Forest, when he begins to dislike Red even more when he helps heal the wounded young of a Kangaskhan he has been trying to capture. Seeing each other's faults, Blue and Red become official rivals. After Red saves him when he becomes possessed by a wild Gastly in the Pokémon Tower, Blue collaborates with him to defeat Team Rocket member Koga. When they later encounter, they accidentally trade all their Pokémon with each other, so Blue takes the liberty of training Red's Pokémon to their limits. The two rivals work together again, this time with Blue, when Professor Oak is kidnapped by Team Rocket, narrowly defeating Koga again as well as the captured Articuno, Zapdos and Moltres. Applying everything he learned from Red, Blue faces off against Red in the final match of the Indigo Plateau Pokémon League Tournament. Although he loses the battle, he considers Red to be a true friend and important companion.

In the Yellow saga, Blue helps train the rookie Pokémon trainer Yellow during her search for Red, who had been kidnapped by the Elite Four. Teaming up with his allies, as well as his former enemy Koga, Blue helps defeat the Elite Four. In the Gold, Silver & Crystal saga, Blue takes Red's place when he withdraws from a test to become the Gym Leader of Viridian City. He later defeats his childhood teacher, the Gym Leader Chuck, in a tournament pitting Johto Gym Leaders against the Kanto Leaders. He and the other Gym Leaders are tricked into boarding the Magnet Train while it is rigged to crash, but are rescued by Red. He accompanies his allies again to defeat the Mask of Ice of Neo Team Rocket. In the FireRed and LeafGreen saga, Blue helps Red disband the newly resurrected Team Rocket but is turned to stone. He is eventually released in the Emerald saga.

Blue returns in the X and Y chapter of the manga and while on a quest seeking their third Kalos legendary Pokémon Zygarde. His Charizard later Mega Evolves into Mega Charizard Y which was first seen alongside X's Mega Charizard X. He was voted as the eighth most popular character in the series in Japan 2011.

Green
She makes her debut in Volume 2 when trying to sell fake items to Red after flirting with him. As the series progresses, however, she decides to team up with the other Pallet Town trainers, Red and Blue, in order to defeat Sabrina of Team Rocket.

Green returns later in the saga, having qualified for the Pokémon League Tournament. She progresses through the tournament and into the semifinals, but is defeated by Professor Oak, who uses bird Pokémon, as it was her phobia. Upon learning of her problem, Professor Oak takes pity on her, giving her the third Pokédex and forgiving her for stealing his Squirtle.

In the Yellow Saga, set two years later, Green is a sort of "shadow" trainer, trailing Yellow. She is the one who sends Yellow on a mission to find Red and disguise herself as a boy. In the third volume, it is revealed that Green had been snatched at the age of five by a mysterious bird Pokémon, which gave her a debilitating phobia of bird type Pokémon. Green blamed the Elite Four for this disaster, carrying a grudge against the Elite Four into the Gold/Silver saga.

In the Gold, Silver & Crystal saga, Green first appears in volume 13, when she is shown at a Pokémon Gym Leader's Tournament. It is revealed that she and Silver were two of the Masked Children, and had escaped from the grasp of the Mask of Ice, the leader of Neo Team Rocket, at a young age, while others abducted along with them remained and became the Mask of Ice's servants. Because of this, she shares a close bond with Silver and frequently treats him like a younger brother. She later helps out in the final battle against the Mask of Ice by using the three legendary birds with Red and Blue, and overcomes her bird phobia whilst protecting Silver.

In the FireRed and LeafGreen saga, Green appears while traveling to the Sevii Islands to meet her parents. However, Psychic Pokémon Deoxys captures her parents, causing Green to faint in shock when she is injured in the encounter with it. When she wakes, not fully recovered, she and Blue discover that Red was defeated by Deoxys, and rushes to his side after he runs away to recollect himself. She reveals to him the real reason why Professor Oak wanted Red and the others to return their Pokédex and Green resolves to train, despite not being fully healed, to fight against Team Rocket and Deoxys. In the end of this saga, they manage to stop Deoxys and disband the newly revived Team Rocket, however, she is turned to stone in the process.

She, along with the Kanto Pokédex holders, appears in the Emerald saga, but she is still encased in stone. At the end of the chapter, she escapes from the stone. She and the other Pokédex Holders defeat the fake Kyogre by unleashing all of their ultimate moves. In the aftermath, she participates in a tournament against the other nine Pokédex Holders.

After the events during the Emerald Saga, Green appears alongside Red in Hoenn, during the Omega Ruby and Alpha Sapphire saga, confronting Maxie and Archie, defeating their Pokémon by Mega Evolving her Blastoise. Red and Green are then defeated when the two villains perform the "Primal Reversion" on Kyogre and Groudon, overpowering them and knocking them out. They are later revealed to have survived thanks to Giovanni who took them on his airship. Green's Pokémon include Blasty (Blastoise), Jiggly (Wigglytuff), a Snubbull, Clefty (Clefable), and Ditty (Ditto). Green originally has a Horsea, but returns it to its rightful trainer.

She was voted as the ninth most popular character in the series in Japan 2011.

Yellow
A character exclusive to Pokémon Adventures, she has the powers to heal Pokémon, hear their thoughts and slight psychokinesis, and it is said that there is only one child who inherits this power every ten years from Viridian Forest. She is a happy-go-lucky girl who isn't very good at Pokémon battles as she dislikes them because she cannot bring herself to hurt Pokémon. There have also been hints throughout the manga that she has a crush on Red.

She first appears in the final volume of the first arc, though her name is not revealed until the Yellow saga. Having lost her way in the Viridian Forest, Yellow is attacked by a wild Dratini. Red saves her and escorted her back to her hometown, Viridian City, and helps her catch her first Pokémon, a Rattata. Later, Yellow finds Red seriously injured following his battle with Giovanni, and helps him.

Two years later, Yellow shows up at Professor Oak's lab disguised as a boy, and obtains Red's Pokédex and pikachu. Green had sent her on a mission to rescue Red from the Kanto Elite Four, because of her mysterious powers that allow her to heal and communicate with Pokémon, which counter the same powers of Lance, the leader of the Elite Four. Yellow fights against the Elite Four while defending Pika, Red's pikachu, which had escaped from them. Despite opposition from the Kanto Leaders who are Red's friends, Yellow is supported by Professor Oak. Yellow encounters the Elite Four and meets Bill and Blaine. Yellow also trains with Blue. Yellow then joins forces with the Gym Leaders, Bill, Blue, Green, and the former members of Team Rocket. In the final battle, with the help of Giovanni, who also has the special powers, Yellow defeats Lance. She stops the Elite Four from gaining control of a mysterious, powerful, Pokémon, later revealed to be Lugia. Her true gender is revealed at the end of Volume 6, but she puts off informing Red of it.

In the Gold, Silver & Crystal saga, Yellow travels to Johto and meets up with Crystal while pursuing Lugia. It is revealed that Yellow was the one who woke up the three legendary beasts - Suicune, Raikou, and Entei - from within the Burned Tower in Ecruteak. Yellow and Crystal are then separated by Lugia at sea.

After the attack, Yellow and her uncle wash up on shore, where they are brought to the Pokémon daycare center run by an elderly couple. Soon, the center is attacked by a group of Neo Team Rocket members who seem only to be interested in Yellow's hat. In truth, the two feathers on her hat are the Silver Wing from Lugia and the Rainbow Wing from Ho-Oh, the keys to traveling in time, stolen from the Mask of Ice many years ago and planted there by Blue.

After fleeing from the center, Yellow continues to Ilex Forest, where she finds Crystal, Silver, Red, Blue, and Green battling the Mask of Ice. As the Mask of Ice captures Celebi and traveled back in time, they find that Gold is trapped within time and needes the feathers to be freed. Gold and Yellow finally realize that the feathers are on her hat, and she is forced to take it off in front of Red in order to save Gold. At this point, Red finally learns Yellow's true gender.

During the FireRed and LeafGreen arc, Yellow (having grown older) returns to Viridian City. While there, she meets Silver, who believed that he may have originally come from this area and had ties to the Viridian Gym before he was kidnapped by Mask of Ice, and is now looking for his family. With her aid and the sudden arrival of the Team Rocket operatives Orm and Sird (whom the two promptly face in a battle), Silver learns that he was the son of Giovanni, former Viridian City Gym leader and head of Team Rocket. After he is kidnapped by the evil duo, Yellow gives chase on her Butterfree, and soon manages to break into the Team Rocket helicopter to rescue him. Yellow is not a fighter but as she grows angry, her Pokémons' levels rise to the eighties due her power and the special training by Blue earlier, making her as dangerous as the other Kanto champions in battle. She later reunites with Red, Blue and Green, and helps permanently disband Team Rocket in the Sevii Islands, but is turned to stone while doing so. She is freed from the stone in the Emerald Arc, where Yellow commands Pika (Red's Pikachu), Chuchu (her Pikachu), and Gold's Pichu to use Volt Tackle together to finish off Guile's giant Kyogre.

Yellow's Pokémon are Ratty (Raticate, her first and evolved Pokémon), Dody (Dodrio), Gravvy (Golem, given by Brock as a Graveler,) Omny, (Omastar, given by Misty as an Omanyte,) Kitty (Butterfree) and Chuchu (Pikachu). Yellow has a special bond with both her pikachu, Chuchu, and Red's pikachu, Pika, who have an egg together. 
Yellow was voted as the fourth most popular character in the series in Japan 2011.

Johto Pokédex Holders

Gold
 is an athletic, somewhat goofy boy. He lives in a house full of various Pokémon in New Bark Town. Because of this, the neighbours have dubbed him "The Pokémon boy". He starts with the Pokémon Cyndaquil. Gold is immature and mischievous, and likes playing billiards, sometimes using his Pokémon to cheat. He often listens to the radio because of his idol, DJ Mary from the Goldenrod Radio Station. He usually wears a pair of goggles and travels on a scooter. Instead of throwing or kicking his Poké Balls, he uses a billiard cue to shoot them out. Gold's hobbies include gambling, skateboarding, and trying foods from different cities. Gold's special skill, as described by Professor Oak, is Pokémon hatching and is known as the "Breeder". He has the ability to draw out the largest potential of a baby Pokémon, having lived with Pokémon his whole life.

In truth, Gold is a kind-hearted but very hot-headed young man. When he first meets Bugsy, he mistakes him for a female and asked him out for tea. He also asks Jasmine, the Olivine City Gym Leader out on a date. However, he is quite smart, as shown when like when facing Lance's Dragonair, and when fighting at the Pokéathlon. When he first met Crystal he did not get along with her.

Along with his rival, Silver and Crystal, Gold fights with the other Pokédex holders against the Mask of Ice, managing to cure Pryce (the true identity of the Mask of Ice) of his sadness with the help of Celebi. He even sacrifices himself without hesitating to stop Pryce, then being saved by Celebi. After Red, Blue, Green, Yellow, and Silver are petrified into stone by the after-effects of the energy blast caused by Deoxys, Gold and Crystal appear in the Battle Frontier saga in hopes of reviving their old companions, the statues trapped at the end of the top room of the Battle Tower. After Gold's friends are released from stone, he, alongside Emerald and all previous Pokédex holders fight Guile Hideout, and after defeating him, host a Pokémon Battle tournament.

In the HeartGold and SoulSilver arc, Gold returns as a main character, and takes part in the Pokéathlon. Ultimately he bears the responsibility of calming Arceus down.

He was voted as the second most popular character in the series in Japan 2011.

Silver
 is a boy who was kidnapped by the Mask of Ice as a child, and grew up alongside Green. Silver is very fond of Green and the two share a bond close to that of siblings. After the two children escaped, Green traveled to Kanto and Silver remained in Johto where he stole Elm's Totodile under Lance's orders. In the end of the saga, he reunites with Green and helps in defeating the Mask of Ice and disbanding his organization, Neo Team Rocket.

Silver makes his reappearance in the FireRed and LeafGreen arc as he is searching for clues to find his family. After seeking the help of Yellow in Virdian City, Sird of Team Rocket reveals Silver that he is Giovanni's son. Silver refuses to believe this, until Giovanni risks his life to save him. This caused Silver to accept Giovanni as his father, and decides to help him find redemption. In the end of the saga, he is turned to stone by Team Rocket. He is released in the Emerald Arc.

In the HeartGold and SoulSilver arc, Silver returns as a main character.

He was voted as the seventh most popular character in the series in Japan 2011.

Crystal
As a child, she fell after getting startled by an Arcanine, and broke both of her arms. Because of the accident, she learned to catch Pokémon by kicking Poké Balls, a habit she has kept long after her arms healed.

She has many Pokémon before first appearing, but her "starter" Pokémon is a Chikorita which escaped from Professor Elm's laboratory, desperate to go on a journey. Her Pokémon include a Smoochum (named Chumee), a Hitmonchan (Monlee), a Parasect (Parasee), an Arcanine (Archy), a Natu (Natee), and a Cubone (Bonee). She is chosen by Suicune, a legendary Pokémon to help defeat the Mask of Ice.

She dispatches Emerald to the Battle Frontier to find and capture Jirachi, as a way to free Silver, Red, Blue, Green, and Yellow from stone.

Crys is usually gentle and amiable, but also has a serious and perhaps intimidating side when it comes to working. Her aggressive and enthusiastic attitude in Pokémon capturing overwhelms Oak, terrifies Bill, and Gold is fond of calling her the "Representative of Club Serious". In the Emerald series, she successfully gets Ruby and Sapphire to join her side in scorning Gold's bragging, although the same cannot be said for Emerald. Crys currently works as Oak's assistant, and stations either at his Kanto, Johto, or Hoenn Science Lab branch.

According to the series, she has captured at least one of every non-legendary Pokémon in the world and has completed the Pokédex in every incarnation.

Crys's design is based on the female protagonist of Pokémon Crystal, the third sequel to Pokémon Gold and Pokémon Silver. Her appearance is almost identical to her game counterpart, with the exception of a pair of star-shaped earrings, and her hair colour, which is dark blue instead of the game character's greenish-blue.

In the HeartGold and SoulSilver arc, Crystal returns as the main character. She is forced by her mother to wear clothes similar to those of Lyra, the female protagonist in the  Pokémon HeartGold and SoulSilver games.

She was voted as the twelfth most popular character in the series in Japan 2011.

Hoenn Pokédex Holders

Ruby
 is a Trainer from the Johto region. He moves with his mother to Hoenn to live closer to his father Norman, the Gym Leader of Petalburg City. Despite being a Gym Leader's son, Ruby hates battling and prefers Pokémon Contests.

Ruby is introduced as a vain and condescending young man but it is revealed that he does have a good heart. He arrives in Hoenn on his eleventh birthday, and runs away from his new home since he believes that his father Norman would not endorse his choice to be a Pokémon Coordinator. This is initially true, but Norman had decided to let Ruby become a Coordinator at this point.

After running away, he met Sapphire, the daughter of Professor Birch. Sapphire challenges Ruby with the bet that is eighty days, they would both travel around Hoenn, each trying to achieve their respective goals (he would try to win every Contest and she would try to win all eight Hoenn Gym Badges).

His first three Pokémon are Nana (a Poochyena), Kiki (a Skitty), and Rara (a Ralts). He lends Rara to Wally, but due to an earthquake which separates them, he does not get her back until much later. Ruby's other Pokémon are Feefee (a Feebas), Fofo (a Castform), and Mumu (a Mudkip). In Volume 22, it is revealed that Ruby also owns a Celebi that he came across in Johto.

Ruby may dislike Pokémon Battles, but he is a capable Pokémon Trainer in his own right. At the age of six, he actually liked climbing trees and battling Pokémon. However, when he injured himself while protecting a girl from a Salamence, the girl became frightened and cried. Ruby assumed at the time that the reason the girl was scared was because he fought too fiercely. From that day onwards, he tried not to battle, only resorting to it when no one else was watching him or he has no other choice, focusing only on the beauty and non-combat qualities of his Pokémon.

It is revealed in Volume 21 that Ruby likes Sapphire and she was the girl who Ruby had rescued, though neither of them recognized the other when they met at the beginning of the arc. Ruby realizes her identity when she reminisces the event, and reveals his identity to her by showing her a scar on his forehead, which he sustained while holding off the wild Salamence.

Ruby is based on Brendan in the Pokémon video games, just like how Sapphire is based on May. However, unlike Brendan, Ruby is a Pokémon Coordinator and Brendan a Pokémon Trainer.

In the Omega Ruby and Alpha Sapphire arc, Ruby returns as a main character.

He was voted as the third most popular character in the series in Japan 2005 & 2011.

Sapphire

She returns in the Omega Ruby and Alpha Sapphire arc, as a main character.

The daughter of Professor Birch, Sapphire is a wild tomboy, with absolutely no manners, who usually wears clothing made out of leaves. She eventually encountered Ruby, the son of Petalburg Gym Leader Norman, who was in the process of running away from his new home in Littleroot Town.

While saving Ruby from two Mightyena, Sapphire injures herself. In gratitude for saving him, Ruby tends to her wounds makes made an outfit for her. In Volume 19, it is shown that the reason why Sapphire chose to wear the clothes he made for her was because he wrote, in a letter enclosed with the clothes, that the clothes would definitely fit her. Sapphire gets another outfit change at the end of Volume 19. Once again, Ruby makes the clothes for her, and told her personally that the new clothes would fit her.

Sapphire may be wild and tomboyish, but she is a devoted Pokémon Trainer who would go to any lengths to achieve her goals and protect what she treasures most. She is very upset by Ruby declaring that he would rather go back to Johto than stand beside the Gym Leaders as they prepare to face Team Aqua and Team Magma. She persuades Winona to battle her, and the Gym Leader is so impressed by her fighting spirit and her will to defend Hoenn that she gave Sapphire the Feather Badge.

In Volume 21, Sapphire is revealed to have a crush on Ruby, though it had been hinted on several occasions before that. In the Emerald arc, however, Ruby claims to have forgotten the events during the Groudon and Kyogre affair including their confession of their feelings for each other due to the time void while leaving Mirage Island; whether or not this is true, however, has yet to be proven. In the Omega Ruby and Alpha Sapphire arc, it's hinted that Ruby was probably faking and that he seems to have feelings for Sapphire.

The reason for Sapphire's wild, tomboyish personality is due to an incident that occurred when she and Ruby met briefly at the age of five. The two were attacked by a wild (later revealed to be Zinnia's) Salamence. Ruby protected Sapphire, leading her to believe that she should stand up for herself more. It is highly probable that, because of this belief, she chose to abandon her docile personality, turning her attention to Pokémon Battles. She did not recognize Ruby when they encountered again, only realizing his identity when she saw the scar on his forehead which he received during the Salamence attack.

Sapphire is based on May. May is the female character from the video games. However, Sapphire's character is notably different from the other two versions of May, especially the version from the anime, in terms of personality and attitude.

In the Omega Ruby and Alpha Sapphire arc, Sapphire returns as a main character.

She was voted as the fifth most popular character in the series in Japan 2011, tied with Diamond.

Emerald
 is a challenger in the Battle Frontier. He is an excellent battler and has proved it several times by defeating several Frontier Brains. He is also considered to be exceptional at catching Pokémon, and for that Crystal has hired him to catch the legendary Jirachi.

Arrogant and impatient, despite his great interest and expert knowledge in Pokémon battling, he claims to not like Pokémon very much, claiming that his belief is that Pokémon cannot win in a battle by using the trainer's faith in them over strategy. However, this belief shifts when he acquires Sceptile, Sudowoodo and Dusclops from the Battle Frontier, coming to accept them more as friends rather than tools. He appears to be extremely short, and he is actually shorter than he looks. Under his long sleeved clothes he has high platform shoes, and he always holds a pair of external mechanical hands which he holds with his real hands. However, these are mostly tactical places to keep most of his capturing equipment; for example, his platform shoes include several rows with different kinds of Pokéballs. He also has a rare ability to calm Pokémon by making them remember their birthplace. Emerald does so using soil from the Pokémon's birthplace, which is compacted and placed into a special gun he carries. By shooting the ground the Pokémon is standing on, the feeling can calm the Pokémon in a matter of seconds.

When the Battle Frontier is attacked by rampaged Pokémon from the Battle Factory that Guile Hideout releases, Noland allowed Emerald to have a rampaged Snorlax, Mantine and Mr. Mime to help him out. These are the other three Pokémon in Emerald's main team. He is also good friends with the legendary Pokémon, Latios and Latias, who have affectionately given him the nickname .

In the Omega Ruby and Alpha Sapphire arc, Emerald returns as a main character.

He was voted as the thirteenth most popular character in the series in Japan 2011.

Sinnoh Pokédex Holders

Diamond
, also known as Dia (ダイヤ, Daiya) for short,  is a character in the "Fourth Generation" of the Pokémon Special manga in Japan, based on the main male character from Pokémon Diamond and Pearl, Lucas. Being twelve years old, Diamond started out with a Munchlax called Lax.

Diamond is a good friend of Pearl and the pair form a Pokémon comedy duo, with Diamond acting as the boke (funny man) of the pair. Though seemingly dim-witted at first and possessing a perpetual habit of eating wherever he goes, Diamond is somewhat smarter than he looks. He stands up to foes in times of distress, and has been shown to be observant in a mishap involving wild Bidoof.

Due to a mix-up, Pearl believes that he and Diamond are on a reality television series; if they successfully escort Ms. Berlitz to Mt. Coronet, they will receive a prize (this is untrue, however, as Diamond has suspected something was wrong since the beginning, and chose to stay silent so that the journey could continue). Berlitz, believing the duo to be her bodyguards, gives them Pokédexes, Pokétches, and starter Pokémon from Professor Rowan. Diamond receives a Turtwig from her and nicknames it Tru. Tru has now evolved into a Torterra. He has also  obtained a Shieldon named Don, from Byron. He also has a Lickilicky called Kit. Platinum just recently gave him a Mamoswine that he has named Moo. Diamond also bonded with the legendary Pokémon Regigigas.

During the Platinum arc Diamond and Pearl investigate the information in Charon's notebook, and ultimately end up having to stop Charon's evil plan of capturing all of Sinnoh's legends to take over the world.

He was voted as the fifth most popular character in the series in Japan 2011, tied with Sapphire.

Pearl
 is a character from Sinnoh and one of the three leading characters in the Diamond and Pearl arc of Pokémon Adventures.

Pearl has a hasty personality and a habit of butting into conversations along with exploding with rage if a person does not give him eye contact when he speaks to them.  He and Diamond are friends, though Pearl is known for frequently getting them into trouble.  Together, they form a Pokémon comedy duo with Pearl acting as the tsukkomi (straight man) of their duo.

Because of a mix-up, he thinks that escorting Ms. Berlitz to Mt. Coronet is part of a reality television show and by accomplishing this task, they will win a prize.  Berlitz, believing the duo to be her bodyguards, gives them Pokédexes, Pokétches, and starter Pokémon from Professor Rowan.  Pearl receives a Chimchar, which he nicknames "Chimler", from Berlitz, which has evolved into an Infernape.  Along with Chimchar, he also has a Chatot named Chatler. Later he gets a Luxray, that he befriended when the Luxray was still a Luxio. Later, with the help of Crasher Wake, Pearl captures a Tauros, Diglett and a Buizel (which likes to attack Pearl).

During the Platinum arc Diamond and Pearl investigate the information in Charon's notebook, and ultimately end up having to stop Charon's evil plan of capturing all of Sinnoh's legends to take over the world.

His father is a fairly successful Pokémon trainer, and Pearl has learned some useful talents from him; such as the ability to tell what move a Pokémon is going to use just by its stance.

He is based on Barry, the rival character from Pokémon Diamond and Pearl and its successor, Pokémon Platinum.

He was voted as the tenth most popular character in the series in Japan 2011.

Platinum

Platinum Berlitz comes from a 200-year-old family of wealthy scholars famous in Sinnoh and wears pearl and diamond rings. She does not give her name to "commoners"; therefore, her given name was previously unknown. However, her name was revealed as Platinum to coincide with the recently released (at the time) game, Pokémon Platinum Version.

The Berlitz family tradition is for members coming of age to travel to the peak of Mt. Coronet to obtain materials to make their personal family crest. At the suggestion of Berlitz's butler, Sebastian, her father hired two bodyguards to protect her in her journey. Professor Rowan provided her with three Pokédexes, three Pokétches, and three of his starter Pokémon so that Platinum would share them with her bodyguards to assist him in his research.

She owns a Piplup and a Ponyta. Her Piplup has evolved into a Prinplup then an Empoleon. Her Ponyta evolved into a Rapidash when she confronted Byron. Platinum is very competitive; over the course of her story, she has entered contests and battled gym leaders. She has caught a Lopunny, which she brings out for the first time during her battle with Candice.  During the battle at Spear Pillar, Gardenia gives Platinum a Cherrim, Candice gives Platinum a Froslass and Volkner asked Maylene to give Platinum a Pachirisu.

In the Platinum arc, she works together with Looker, an officer of the International Police. Her aim is to find and rescue the two men originally hired to be her bodyguards, who had been banished to the Distortion World. Looker suggests challenging the Frontier Brains of the Sinnoh Battle Frontier so that they may reveal any information that they know.

Platinum's design is based on the female player character of Pokémon Diamond, Pearl, and Platinum, Dawn.

She was voted as the eleventh most popular character in the series in Japan 2011.

Unova Pokédex Holders

Black
 is one of the protagonists of Pokémon Adventures. He is a hot-headed trainer and meets White in an accident with a Galvantula; White makes it her responsibility to repay damages caused by Black to a filming company, and hires Black to her recruitment firm.  Black's design is based on the male character, Hilbert from Pokémon Black and White.

Black not only goes on a quest for the Gym Badges of Unova to enter the Pokémon League, but also makes it an objective to defeat Team Plasma. He ultimately becomes the "Hero of Truth" after awakening Reshiram from the Light Stone, and battles N, the "Hero of Ideals" who had long awakened Zekrom from the Dark Stone. Black wins, but is then sealed in the Light Stone along with Reshiram.

He was voted as the fifteenth most popular character in the series in Japan in 2011.

White
 is one of the protagonists of Pokémon Adventures. She owns a female Tepig, named Gigi, and is the owner of a Pokémon recruitment firm called the BW Agency, which rents Pokémon to movies and ads.

White is very reluctant to battle, and had panicked when Black had once told her, while battling N of Team Plasma, that she may need to battle. She admitted to him that she had never battled before. When N's Purrloin had attacked Gigi, instead of commanding Gigi to attack or defend against Purrloin, she told Purrloin off for attacking an actress.

White's design is based on the female player, Hilda from Pokémon Black and White.

After a successful opening of her latest brainchild, the Pokémon Musical, White is suddenly trapped in a Ferris wheel by N, who convinces Gigi to leave White. White recovers from the trauma of the event and takes up Pokémon battling. She is rewarded with a Pokédex after being given the opportunity to test her newly acquired skill. She also obtains N's Servine who follows her for a mysterious reason, which she evolves into Serperior and eventually grows close to.

She was voted as the twenty-second most popular character in the series in Japan in 2011.

Blake
As a member, he is given the task to search the previously defeated Neo Team Plasma. He initially appears to be a womanizer; however, he is actually a serious individual when he is on job.

Blake is based on the male player character, Nate from Pokémon Black 2 and White 2]]. Unlike previous characters in Pokémon Adventures, his Japanese name "Lack-Two" is a corruption of his representative game's title (Black 2) rather than a direct application.

Whitley
She is a former member of Team Plasma. Whitley is a very gentle girl who is against keeping her Pokémon in Pokeballs.

Whitley is designed after the female player character, Rosa from [[Pokémon Black 2 and White 2|Pokémon Black 2 and White 2. Unlike previous characters in Pokémon Adventures, her Japanese name "Whi-Two" is a corruption of her representative game's title (White 2) rather than a direct application.

Kalos Pokédex Holders

X
 is one of the main characters of the X and Y arc. He has a nickname  called by Shauna. As a Junior Trainer, he won a major Pokémon Battle Tournament and everyone expects that he will become either a Gym Leader or a member of the Elite Four one day. The fame and paparazzi got to him, and he does not trust other people anymore, and he stays home as a shut in. It is only Y's urging that gets him to leave his house for the first time in several years and travel around Kalos. He possesses a Kangaskhan named , as well as her child , that he uses in battle. He temporarily uses Chespin in battle, but later decides to keep it, nicknaming it Marisso, which has presently evolved into its final form Chesnaught. He also gains a Charizard nicknamed Salamè, a Manentric nicknamed Élec, a Gengar nicknamed Garma and a Pinsir nicknamed Rute. X also has a Mega Ring that Mega Evolves Kanga so both Kanga and Lil' Kanga can battle, as well as most of his other Pokémon excluding Chesnaught (his Charizard possesses the Mega Stone for its Mega Charizard X form). Later during the battle against Zygarde, X borrows several Key Stones which allows him to use all of his Mega Pokémon at the same time. At the end of the arc, X plans on heading for Shalour City to officially become a Mega Evolution Successor.

X is designed after Calem from Pokémon X and Y.

Y
She has nickname  and  called by Shauna. She is a with her Fletchling, nicknamed Fletchy, which eventually evolved into Fletchinder.

Y was originally a talented Rhyhorn Racer, like her mother, but decided to pursue a new life as a Sky Trainer. She organizes the traveling around Kalos for herself and her friends Trevor, Tierno, Shauna, and X, despite X's desire to stay home due to his bad experiences as a child. She temporarily uses Froakie in battle, but later decides to keep it, nicknaming it Croaky which eventually evolved into a Greninja. She also attempts to befriend an Eevee, and she nicknames it . Veevee later evolves into a Sylveon during their first encounter with Team Flare. Y later obtains the legendary Pokémon Xerneas for her team, nicknaming it Xerxer, as well as Absol which can Mega Evolve, nicknaming it SolSol. During the final battle, Xerxer is lost when it reverted into a tree. At the end of the arc, she rests for her next semester at Sky Trainer Academy.

Y is designed after Serena from Pokémon X and Y.

Alola Pokédex Holders

Sun
 is one of the main characters of the Sun and Moon arc. He moved to Alola from the Kanto region. He works various odd jobs and a delivery service in order to repay 100 billion yen (1 million dollars in the English version) to an unknown person. Later in the arc it is revealed that Sun wanted to buy back his late great grandfather's island, which the Aether Foundation used to build their headquarters after he died. In the story, he is given the task of calming Alola's Totem Pokémon after a crisis involving Ultra Beasts makes its way into the region. He also takes up a job from the International Police to find Zygarde Cells scattered throughout the region. He has been known by the nickname "The Courier". Sun has a Meowth in Alolan form nicknamed Cent a Incineroar nicknamed Dollar that he got from Professor Kukui, a Wishiwashi nicknamed Quarter that Sun befriended after defeating a Totem Pokémon, A Mimikyu named Penny that Sun met in an abandoned mall, a Crabominable named Loot that took a berry important to Sun's quest, and an Ultra Beast, a Stakataka named Drachma. Sun also uses various Ride Pokémon as a means of getting around the region.

Sun is designed after the male player, Elio from Pokémon Sun and Moon.

Moon
 is one of the main characters of the Sun and Moon arc. She moved to Alola from Sinnoh region. She is a professional archer and skilled pharmacist, and was sent a Rotom to make the Rotom Pokédex. She came to Alola to find ingredients that would cure her Piplup after accidentally poisoning it. She is also the sister of Platinum Berlitz. Moon owns a Rowlet (which evolves into a Decidueye), Charjabug, Maraenie, an Alolan Muk, and a Rotom inside of a Pokédex.

Moon is designed after the female player, Selene from Pokémon Sun and Moon.

Galar Pokédex holders

Henry Sword
Henry Sword, known as ) in the Japanese version, is a boy from Galar. He has a nickname in the Japanese version . He is a gear smith who specializes in repairing weapons, including the ones of his Pokémon.  Henry owns a  Rillaboom (Twiggy), Sirfetch'd (Lancelot), Gurdurr (Steeler), Oranguru (Fanguru), Mr. Rime (Sutekkin), and Urshifu (Rapid Strike Form).  

Henry Sword is designed after the male player character, Victor from Pokémon Sword and Shield.

Casey Shield
Casey Shield, known as ) in the Japanese version, is a girl from Galar. She has a nickname  in the Japanese version or Schilly in the English fan translation. She is very hyperactive and is constantly shouting. A year prior to the chapter's events, she lost her Pokémon and, with the help of Henry, takes on the Galar Gym leaders in order to campaign for their search. Casey owns a Cinderace (Bit), Arrokuda (Kilo), Toxtricity (Tera), Eiscue (Peta), Falinks (Giga), and a Galarian Stunfisk (Mega).

Casey Shield is designed after the female player character, Gloria from Pokémon Sword and Shield.

Former Pokédex holders

Wally
) Is a minor character in the Ruby/Sapphire arc and is based on the rival character in Ruby and Sapphire. Wally suffers from severe asthma, which limits his oppurtunities to catch and train Pokémon. Ruby gives his Ralts, Rara, to Wally, and he catches a Kecleon in the Petalburg Woods. In the climax of the story, he obtains a Pokédex and a Treecko meant for Emerald, and teams up with Norman to climb the Sky Pillar and awaken Rayquaza. Wally's Pokémon are Kecleon, Cacturne, Roselia, Flygon, Altaria, and Magnezone.

Cheren

Bianca

Pokémon League

Gym Leaders

Kanto Gym Leaders
 Brock:
 Misty:
 Lt. Surge (:
 :
 Koga:
 Sabrina:
 Blaine:
 Janine:

Johto Gym Leaders
 Falkner:
 Bugsy:
 Whitney:
 Morty:
 Chuck:
 Jasmine:
 Pryce / :
 Clair:

Hoenn Gym Leaders
 Roxanne:
 Brawly:
 Wattson:
 Flannery:
 Norman:
 Winona:
 Tate and Liza:
 Wallace:
 Juan:

Sinnoh Gym Leaders
 Roark:
 Gardenia:
 Maylene:
 Crasher Wake:
 Fantina:
 Byron:
 Candice:
 Volkner:

Unova Gym Leaders
 Cilan, Chili and Cress:
 Lenora:
 Burgh:
 Elesa:
 Clay:
 Skyla:
 Brycen:
 Drayden and :
 Roxie:
 Marlon:

Kalos Gym Leaders
 :
 Grant:
 Korrina:
 Ramos:
 Clemont:
 Valerie:
 Olympia:
 Wulfric:

Galar Gym Leaders
 Milo:
 Nessa:
 :
 Allister:
 Opal:
 Raihan:

Trial Captains and Island Kahunas

Trial Captains
 Lana:
 Kiawe:
 Mallow:
 :
 :
 Sophocles:
 Mina:

Island Kahunas
 :
 Olivia:
 Nanu:
 :

Elite Four and Champions

Kanto Elite Four and Champion
 Lorelei:
 Bruno:
 Agatha:
 Lance:

Johto Elite Four and Champion
 Will:
 Karen:
Koga
Bruno

Hoenn Elite Four and Champion
 Sidney:
 Phoebe:
 Glacia:
 Drake:
 Steven Stone:

Sinnoh Elite Four and Champion
 Aaron:
 Bertha:
 Flint:
 Lucian:
 Cynthia:

Unova Elite Four and Champion
 Shauntal:
 Grimsley:
 Caitlin:
 Marshal:
 Alder:

Kalos Elite Four and Champion
 Malva:
 Siebold:
 Wikstrom:
 Drasna:
 Diantha:

Alola Elite Four
 :

Galar Champion
 Leon:

Battle facility leaders

Frontier Brain

Hoenn Frontier Brain
 Factory Head Noland:
 Pike Queen Lucy:
 Pyramid King Brandon:
 Arena Tycoon Greta:
 Dome Ace Tucker:
 Palace Maven Spenser:
 Salon Maiden Anabel:

Sinnoh Frontier Brain
 Castle Valet Darach and Lady Caitlin:
 Arcade Star Dahlia:
 Factory Head Thorton:
 Hall Matron Argenta:
 Tower Tycoon Palmer:

Other Battle facility leaders
 Subway Boss Emmet:
 Subway Boss Ingo:
 Benga:

Pokémon groups

Legendary Pokémon

Kanto Legendary Pokémon
 Articuno: 
 Zapdos:
 Moltres:
 :
 :
 :

Johto Legendary Pokémon
 :
 :
 :
 :
 :

Hoenn Legendary Pokémon
 :
 :
 :
 :
 
 :
 
 :
 :
 :
 :
 :

Sinnoh Legendary Pokémon
 :
 :
 :
 :
 :
 :
 :
 :
 :

Unova Legendary Pokémon
 
 :
 :
 :
 :
 :
 :
 :
 :

Kalos Legendary Pokémon
 :
 :
 :

Alola Legendary Pokémon
 Tapu Koko (:
 Tapu Lele (:
 Tapu Bulu (:
 Tapu Fini (:
 :
 :
 :
 :
 :
 :
 :
 :
 :
 :

Mythical Pokémon
 :
 :
 :
 :
 :
 :
 :
 :
 :
 :
 :
 :
 :
 :
 
 :

Ultra Beasts
  (UB-01 Symbiont):
  (UB-02 Absorption):
  (UB-02 Beauty):
  (UB-03 Lighting):
  (UB-04 Blaster):
  (UB-04 Blade):
  (UB-05 Glutton):
  (UB Burst):
  (UB Assembly):
  (UB Adhesive):
  (UB Stinger):

Villainous teams

Team Rocket/Neo Team Rocket
In Pokémon Adventures, Team Rocket has their own mnemonic for the word "Rocket": "Raid On the City, Knock out... Evil Tusks". Three Gym Leaders - Lt. Surge, Sabrina and Koga - serve directly under the first incarnation of Team Rocket. A fourth Gym Leader, Blaine, used to work for Team Rocket as their scientist, but now joins the alliance of Kanto Gym Leaders not affiliated with Team Rocket (Brock, Misty and Erika).

The first incarnation of Team Rocket is led by Giovanni - the Gym Leader of Viridian City and deputised by three high-profile members of Team Rocket - Ken, Al and Harry, which proclaim themselves as an "Elite Trio". They aim to exploit Pokémon and conquer the world.

Pryce, the Gym Leader of Mahogany Town, leads the first incarnation of Neo Team Rocket under a masked disguise called Mask of Ice. In the past, he captured Ho-Oh and used it to recruit six talented youngsters that would help him achieve his goal of travelling through time. Carl and Sham were based on the designs of the Neo Rocket Executives in Pokémon Gold and Pokémon Silver. Will and Karen, like Carl and Sham, were loyal to Pryce (and thus saw his face behind the mask) but after Pryce's disappearance, formed a new Elite Four with ex-Team Rocket deputy Koga and former Elite Four member Bruno. Finally, Green and Silver, who were kidnapped by Pryce and thus never saw his face, escaped from Pryce when they had the chance, becoming recognized Pokédex holders that contributed to Pryce's defeat in the voids of time.

Carr, Orm and Sird are the deputies of the second incarnation of Team Rocket, exclusive to Pokémon Adventures. They call themselves the Three Beasts. Carr reacted angrily when he found out that Giovanni was searching for his son, and thus tried to wrestle control of Team Rocket. He also attempted to revive Team Rocket at the start of the HeartGold & SoulSilver arc, but was stopped by the Four Generals, who claimed that those who do not follow Giovanni's ideal were not truly representative of Team Rocket. It was also revealed that Sird was originally a founding member of Team Galactic, who pretended to be loyal to Team Rocket but was in fact meant to capture Deoxys for Team Galactic. Before "joining" Team Rocket, she came across the weakened Maxie and Archie and presented a sword and armor to the winner of a fight to the death between Maxie and Archie. Due to an ankle injury sustained on her escape from Kanto, Sird assumed control of a Team Galactic grunt's body and continued operations using his body.

The second incarnation of Neo Team Rocket, led by Archer, Ariana, Proton and Petrel, who are collectively named as the Four Generals, appears in the HeartGold & SoulSilver arc. They aimed to control Arceus, the deity of Pokémon, in order to convince their former leader Giovanni to return. They achieved this by fooling the arc's main protagonists (Gold, Silver and Crystal) into helping them. Arceus created the creation trio of Dialga, Palkia and Giratina, and all appeared to be ready for Giovanni's return. Giovanni did indeed return, but with Lance and Pryce, both of which were antagonists of previous arcs, and worked together with the three main protagonists to stop the creation trio from destroying the world.

 Giovanni:
 :
 :
 Al::
 Harry:
 :
 Carl:
 Sham:
 Three Beasts:
 Carr:
 Orm:
 Sird:
 :
 Archer:
 Ariana:
 Proton:
 Petrel:

Team Aqua and Team Magma
Team Aqua and Team Magma are the criminal entities based in Hoenn. Led by Archie and Maxie respectively, the two teams are portrayed very differently in Pokémon Adventures. Team Aqua is the more established organization that aims to expand the sea; its leader is even the boss of a television station, thus allowing Team Aqua to cover up their actions, including the ending of volcanic activity at Mt. Chimney. Team Magma is the smaller, more disjointed organization that aims to expand the land, but often has little sense of direction. During the climax of the Ruby & Sapphire arc, the two leaders strike a deal to reach the bottom of the sea together. They later assume control of the Blue Orb and Red Orb respectively. However, Archie and Maxie lose control of the orbs, which sink into their bodies. Kyogre and Groudon eventually reach Sootopolis City and start clashing once again. Even after the orbs are knocked out of Archie and Maxie's bodies, the clash continues, and after the clash is stopped, Archie and Maxie re-emerge with greater wickedness and savagery in their minds, and announce their intention to crush anyone that dares to defy them.

In the Emerald arc, Guile Hideout's real identity was revealed as Archie. He was the one who had won the sword and armor from Sird, having beaten Maxie in a fight to the death, and managed to summon a giant Kyogre-like monster to expand the sea, but ultimately disappeared in a flash of light after losing his armour, as well as control of the Battle Frontier's rental Pokémon.

Team Aqua
 Archie / :
 Subleaders of the Sea Scheme
 Matt:
 Shelly:
 Amber:

Team Magma
 Maxie:
 Three Fires:
 Courtney:
 Tabitha:
 Blaise:

Team Galactic
Team Galactic is the criminal entity based in Sinnoh. Their aim of creating a new world had been planned for several years. At the end of the Diamond & Pearl arc, their leader Cyrus, who had been defeated by Diamond, Pearl and Platinum, is dragged into the Distortion World. In the Platinum arc, Team Galactic's scientist Charon becomes the new leader of the team, although the commanders - Mars, Jupiter and Saturn - still regarded Cyrus as their true boss, and tried to find him. In the Distortion World, Cyrus realized that his efforts to create a new world was all in vain - he only ended up creating a portal to the Distortion World. After Charon is ultimately stopped, Cyrus announced the disbandment of Team Galactic.

 Cyrus:
 :
 :
 :
 Charon:
 Advanced level Grunt:

Team Plasma/Neo Team Plasma
Team Plasma is the criminal entity based in Unova. The lesser members of the organization believe that N, a mysterious green-haired man, is their leader, and idolize him like a king. However, in truth N was brainwashed by Ghetsis, the true mastermind behind Team Plasma, whose aim is not to liberate Pokémon, but make all the Pokémon Team Plasma's. Neo Team Plasma is the new criminal entity based in Unova. They aim to rule Unova by freezing the region. They are led by Ghetsis, and surrogate led by Colress.

 :
 The :
 Ghetsis:
 Zinzolin:
 Ryoku:
 :
 Rood:
 Bronius:
 Gorm:
 The Shadow Triad:
 Anthea (the ) and Concordia (the ):
 Colress / :
 Whitley's mother

Team Flare
Team Flare is the main evil organization of the Kalos region. They already appear to have a major influence over Kalos by owning the region's central media outlets to cover up their work. They seek to use X's Mega Ring to succeed in their plans, as well as seeking out Xerneas and Yveltal. Members include the leader Lysandre, scientists Xerosic, Aliana, Bryony, Celosia and Mable, newsreader Malva and butler Chalmers.

 Lysandre:
 Aliana:
 Bryony:
 Celosia:
 Mable:
 Xerosic:
 :
 Lumiose Press editor-in-chief:

Team Skull and Aether Foundation
Team Skull is the criminal group in the Alola region that like to try and steal Pokémon and items from other people with Guzma being their boss. The Aether Foundation, also located in Alola on a man-made island, is a team of scientists working on "helping" injured or fallen Pokémon, however, they were secretly working on creating 3 powerful legendary Pokémon called Type: Full (or Silvally) to combat the strange Ultra Beasts. This didn't go so well when they were awakened they had to be restrained and renamed to Type: Null. One of them Gladion managed to rescue and evolve.

Team Skull
 :
 :
 :

Aether Foundation
 :
 :
 :

Ultra Recon Squad

 :
 Zossie:
 Soliera:
 Phyco:

Team Yell and Macro Cosmos

Team Yell
Team Yell are a group of troublemakers in the Galar region.

 Piers:
 Marnie:

Macro Cosmos

 :
 :

Professors
 Professor Samuel Oak:
 Professor Elm:
 Professor Birch:
 Professor Takao Cozmo:
 Professor Rowan:
 :
 :
 Professor Carolina:
 Professor Aurea Juniper:
 Professor Cedric Juniper:
 Fennel:
 Professor Augustine Sycamore:
 :
 :
 Professor Samson Oak:
 :

Pokémon Storage System developers
 Bill:
 Celio:
 Brigette:
 Lanette:
 Bebe:
 Amanita:
 Cassius:
 Molayne:

Other characters

Kanto
 
 Pokémon Fan Club Chairman:
 
 Fisherman Wilton
 Daisy Oak
 Camper Evan
 Super Nerd Miles
 Ultima:
 Green's parents:

Johto
 Joey
 Gold's mother
 Eusine:
 Kurt:
 Maizie:
 :
 Walker:
 The :
 DJ Mary (:
 :
 The Chairman of Pokémon Association:
 Earl Dervish (:
 :
 Magnus:
 Maximo:

Hoenn
 Ruby's mother:
 Mr. Briney:
 Gabby and Ty:
 Swimmer Jack:
 Joseph Stone:
 Trick Master:
 Wanda:
 Captain Stern:
 Dock:
 :
 Scott:
 Todd Snap:
 Zinnia:
 Lisia:
 Chaz:
 :
 :
 :
 The Elder of Meteor Village:
 Aarune:

Sinnoh
 :
  and :
 Johanna:
 Riley:
 Roseanne:
 Dr. Footstep:
 Rad Rickshaw:
 Mr. Backlot:
 Mr. Fuego:
 Pokétch Co. President:
 "Looker":
 Eldritch:
 Cheryl:
 Mira:
 Marley:
 Buck

Unova
 Bianca's father:
 Hawes:
 The mayor of Nimbasa City:
 Andy:
 Geoff:
 Chris:
 Logan:
 Jeremy:
 :
 :
 Kimi:
 Leo:
 Hugh:
 Hugh's sister:
 :
 Maya:
 :
 Yancy:
 Curtis:
 The :
 Benga:
 International Police Chief:

Kalos
 :
 :
 :
 Grace:
 Alexa:
 Sina & Dexio:
 Gurkinn:
 Emma / Essentia:
 Bonnie:
 Yvette:
 :

Alola
 Lillie:
 :
 :

Galar
 Marvin
 
 :
 Bede (
 The female announcer
 Klara 
 Avery 
 
 Honey 
 
 
 Peonia 

References

Adventures protagonists